American International University West Africa established The Gambia campus in January 2011 in Serekunda. The University offers medical program leading to Doctor of Medicine (MD) Degree. The curriculum is based on American Medical Schools systems. The University is open to students from Africa. AIU Health Science Center consists of 5 colleges: College of Medicine (6 year Program), College of Dentistry (5 year program), College of Pharmacy (5 year program), College of Nursing (3 year program), College of Health Professionals: MLT (2 year program). AIUWA admit students three times a year. The first campus is located at 89 Kairaba Avenue, KSMD, Fajara, The Gambia. 201 students from 14 countries enrolled in 2013. A new campus has been constructed at Kanifing Institutional Area. 120,000 square foot campus houses State of Art classrooms, Laboratories, Library, Conference rooms and other Students facilities. Construction of the new campus started in April 2013 and was completed by end of 2016. It has since graduated a high numbers of Nurses who are helping the Health sector of the county in various parts and most of the graduates are out of the country for further educations(such as Masters) or working with International Organizations such as WHO, UN MRC. although a large number of the students in the school, popularly known as AIUWA are international students, most have them are doing well in their countries. The school is accredited by National Accreditation and Quality Assurance Agency (NAQAA) which was established in 2015. AIUWA is a great place to be and most of the Lecturers in the school are Professors, PhDs and Masters holders.

References
Dhttps://www.google.com/maps/place/American+International+University+West+Africa/@13.4633001,-16.6760713,17z/data=!3m1!4b1!4m5!3m4!1s0xec29bb570fe57f3:0xc3dc172edc7b379c!8m2!3d13.4633001!4d-16.6738826
https://wfme.org/world-directory/
Registered by Ministry of Higher Education, Research, Science and Technology, Government of The Gambia
Accredited by National Accreditation and Quality Assurance Authority, Gambia
Program Accreditation: Pharmacy Council of The Gambia, Nursing and Midwifery Council of The Gambia

External links

https://search.wdoms.org/home/SchoolDetail/F0002927
Full member of Association of African Universities: www.aau.org/membership
American International University	Banjul	The Gambia	www.aiusom.com	Full Member

Universities and colleges in the Gambia
Educational institutions established in 2011
2011 establishments in the Gambia
Serekunda